Chuda Kumari Khadka (born 28 October 1986) is a Nepalese volleyball player. She plays for Nepal women's national volleyball team and Nepal Police Club. She participated at the 2012 Asian Beach Games in Haiyang, China and South Asian Games 2006 in Colombo, Sri Lanka and 2010 in Dhaka, Bangladesh.

References

Nepalese women's volleyball players
1986 births
Living people
People from Okhaldhunga
South Asian Games bronze medalists for Nepal
South Asian Games medalists in volleyball
Nepalese beach volleyball players